Jaipur National University (JNU), established on 22 October 2007, is a private university located in Jaipur, the capital of Rajasthan, India. Founded through an ordinance passed by the Government of Rajasthan.

History 

Jaipur National University came into existence in the year 2007. Two professional institutes of the Seedling Academy, established in 2002, with several technical and professional programs of studies, were re-branded as a university. The university is recognized by the University Grants Commission under section 2(f). The School of Distance Education and Learning was accorded approval by the Joint Committee of the AICTE- DEC for offering certain programs through Distance Education mode.

Academics

Academic programmes 
As an interdisciplinary institution the university offers multiple programs in different colleges.

 School of Business & Management
 School of Computer & Systems Sciences
 School of Education
 School of Engineering & Technology
 School of Hotel Management & Catering Technology
 School of Languages, Literature & Society
 School of Life & Basic Sciences
 School of Nursing
 School of Pharmaceutical Sciences
 School of Social Sciences
 Seedling Institute of Media Studies
 Seedling School of Law & Governance 
 Institute for Medical Sciences and Research Centre, Jaipur. (It has a 390 bedded multi-specialty hospital).

Accreditation 

Jaipur National University and its degrees are on track to be recognized by the University Grants Commission (UGC), All India Council for Technical Education (AICTE). They are authorized to deliver distance learning course per the Distance Education Bureau (DEB). The university was accredited by the NAAC (National Accreditation and Assessment Council) in 2015.

The university is accredited by the Bar council of India, Pharmacy Council of India, Indian Nursing Council (INC), National Council for Teacher Education (NCTE), Bar Council of India  and Medical Council of India (MCI).

Ranking 

The university has been ranked by India Today in 2013, 2014 and 2015 as one of India's Top 30 universities.

SiliconIndia has ranked the university in the MBA Top 20 private universities.

BioSpectrum India has ranked the university in the Top 20 Biotech schools.

References

External links
 

Educational institutions established in 2007
2007 establishments in Rajasthan
Universities and colleges in Jaipur
Universities in Rajasthan
Private universities in India